Clifford G. Williams (27 May 1939 – 2 February 2014) was a Welsh rugby union, and professional rugby league footballer who played in the 1960s and 1970s.

Background
Cliff Williams was born in Abercarn, Wales. He was one of two children. He died aged 74 in Leeds, West Yorkshire. His funeral took place at Lawnswood Cemetery, Leeds, and he is buried in his Hunslet team blazer in grave number 7 (coincidentally his shirt number in rugby league) at Whinmoor Cemetery, Leeds.

Playing career

International honours
Cliff Williams won a cap for Wales (RL) while at Hunslet in 1970.

County honours
Cliff Williams played for Monmouthshire County RFC (RU) during 1966, his final game of rugby union was the victory over Glamorgan County RFC.

Invitational honours
Cliff Williams played for Crawshays RFC (RU) during 1965.

Club career
Cliff Williams was signed by Newport RFC as a replacement for Bob Prosser (who had joined rugby league club St. Helens). Williams made his début for Newport RFC against Wasps RFC on Saturday 23 October 1965, he joined Hunslet on Friday 27 May 1966.

References

External links
Profile at blackandambers.co.uk
Ex-Cross Keys, Newport and Wales rugby league star Cliff Williams dies
Cliff Williams
(archived by archive.is) Profile at swintonlionsrlc.co.uk

1939 births
2014 deaths
Batley Bulldogs players
Crawshays RFC players
Cross Keys RFC players
Hunslet F.C. (1883) players
Monmouthshire County RFC players
Newport RFC players
Rugby league halfbacks
Rugby league players from Caerphilly County Borough
Rugby union players from Abercarn
Rugby union scrum-halves
Swinton Lions players
Wales national rugby league team players
Welsh rugby league players
Welsh rugby union players